Runaway, also called Runaway Killer, is a 1964 New Zealand made thriller film and a road movie. John O’Shea of Pacific Films produced, directed and co-wrote it. Shot in black and white and released on 35 mm and also 16 mm, it was cut to 80 minutes and renamed Runaway Killer for release in Britain, although this lost continuity between scenes. The film stars Colin Broadley in the lead, and several New Zealanders who became famous in other fields; Kiri Te Kanawa, Barry Crump and Ray Columbus.

Plot 
High-flying but high-living accountant David Manning gets heavily into debt, loses his job and goes on the road. He is given a lift by the wealthy Laura, who fancies him and is jealous of Isobel, a young Maori woman they meet. After a fight he steals Laura's car and heads for the mountains of his childhood, meeting Diana on the inter-island ferry and pursued by police. They head up the glacier for a mountain pass. Diana falls, but Manning continues his hazardous journey up towards the pass.

Cast
 Colin Broadley as David Manning 
 Nadja Regin as Laura Kossovich 
 Deidre McCarron as Diana 
 Kiri Te Kanawa as Isobel Wharewera 
 Selwyn Muru as Joe Wharewera
 Barry Crump as Clarrie 
 Gil Cornwall as Tom Morton 
 Sam Stevens as Tana 
 Tanya Binning as Dorothy 
 Doraine Green as Sandra
 Clyde Scott as Athol 
 Rim D. Paul as Simon Rangi
 Alma Woods as Mrs Milligan
 William Johnstone as Alex Manning 
 Murray Smith as Driscoll
 Mary Amoore as Helen Manning
 John Atha as Bellamy 
 Kauri Toi as Mrs Wharewera 
 Ray Columbus as Bandleader

References
New Zealand Film 1912-1996 by Helen Martin & Sam Edwards p54 (1997, Oxford University Press, Auckland)

External links
 
 Runaway – entire film online at the New Zealand Archive of Film, Television & Sound
 Runaway at Rotten Tomatoes website (shown as a 2012 film)

1964 films
1960s New Zealand films
New Zealand drama films
Films set in New Zealand
1960s English-language films
1960s thriller films
Films set in the 1960s
Films shot in New Zealand
1960s road movies